The 2019 Chicago aldermanic election took place in two rounds on February 26 and April 2, 2019, to elect 50 aldermen to the Chicago City Council. Each alderman represents one of Chicago's 50 wards. The elections are non-partisan and use a two-round system where the top two finishers compete in a second-round run-off if no candidate receives more than 50% of the vote in the first round. The elections were party of the 2019 Chicago elections, which included elections for Mayor, City Clerk, City Treasurer.

Of the 50 incumbent aldermen 45 ran for re-election. Incumbents did not run in the 20th, 22nd, 25th, 39th, and 47th wards. Five aldermen ran unopposed: Brian Hopkins (2nd ward), Scott Waguespack (32nd), Gilbert Villegas (36th), Brendan Reilly (42nd), and Nicholas Sposato (38th).

Three aldermen were defeated in the first round, and four more were defeated in run-off elections. There were a total of 12 new aldermen elected: Daniel La Spata (1st ward), Stephanie Coleman (16th), Jeanette Taylor (20th), Michael Rodriguez (22nd), Byron Sigcho-Lopez (25th), Felix Cardona (31st), Rossana Rodríguez (33rd), Samantha Nugent (39th), Andre Vasquez (40th), Jim Gardiner (45th), Matt Martin (47th), and Maria Hadden (49th). After the election, the council's Progressive Caucus grew from 10 to 18 members and a new 6-member Socialist Caucus was formed.

Overview

Campaign 
Candidates for city council are required to submit 473 valid signatures from registered voters in their ward to appear on the ballot. A total of 212 candidates submitted nominating petitions, an increase from 184 candidates in the 2015 election. However, the total number of candidates is lower than the 351 candidates in 2011, the last municipal election that, like 2019, had an open race for mayor.

In the first round, three aldermen who ran for re-election lost their seats. There were run-offs elections in 14 wards: 10 races where incumbents are running, and four races for open seats. At least three additional incumbent aldermen were defeated in run-off elections.

Seat changes

Election calendar

For candidates

For voters

North Side

1st ward 
Incumbent alderman Proco Joe Moreno unsuccessfully sought reelection. Moreno had been appointed alderman in 2010 by Mayor Richard M. Daley, and had subsequently been reelected in 2011 and 2015. Moreno ultimately lost reelection to his sole challenger, Daniel La Spata.

Candidates 

Two write-in candidates filed:
 Richard Benedict Mayers, perennial candidate and alleged white supremacist, write-in candidate for Chicago Mayor, City Clerk, Treasurer in 2019 congressional candidate in 2000, 2002, 2008, 2016, and 2018; 1998 State House candidate; 1993 Berwyn city clerk and city treasurer candidate
Justin Tucker

One candidate was removed from the ballot due to insufficient nominating petition signatures:

 Justin Tucker

The following candidate filed nominating petitions but withdrew before ballot certification:

 Trevor Grant, statistician and data scientist, Illinois National Guard Veteran

Campaign 
Moreno and La Spata appeared at a candidate forum hosted by Logan Square Preservation on January 8, 2019.

Endorsements

Results

2nd ward 
Incumbent first-term alderman Brian Hopkins won reelection, running unopposed on the ballot.

Candidates

Two write-in candidates filed:
 Richard Benedict Mayers, perennial candidate and alleged white supremacist, write-in candidate for Chicago Mayor, City Clerk, and Treasurer  in 2019; congressional candidate in 2000, 2002, 2008, 2016, and 2018; 1998 State House candidate; 1993 Berwyn city clerk and city treasurer candidate
 Mollie May Brady

Endorsements

Results

32nd ward 
Incumbent third-term alderman Scott Waguespack won reelection, running unopposed on the ballot. He appeared at a candidate forum covering the Logan Square neighborhood on January 8, 2019.

Candidates

One write-in candidate filed:
 Richard Benedict Mayers, perennial candidate and alleged white supremacist, write-in candidate for Chicago Mayor, City Clerk, and Treasurer  in 2019; congressional candidate in 2000, 2002, 2008, 2016, and 2018; 1998 State House candidate; 1993 Berwyn city clerk and city treasurer candidate

Endorsements

Results

40th ward 
Incumbent ninth-term alderman Patrick J. O'Connor unsuccessfully sought reelection, being defeated by Andre Vasquez in a runoff.

Candidates 

One write-in candidate filed:
 Richard Benedict Mayers, perennial candidate and alleged white supremacist, write-in candidate for Chicago Mayor, City Clerk, and Treasurer  in 2019; congressional candidate in 2000, 2002, 2008, 2016, and 2018; 1998 State House candidate; 1993 Berwyn city clerk and city treasurer candidate

Endorsements

Campaigns 
A candidate forum organized by several community organizations was scheduled on January 29, 2019.

Results

42nd ward 
Incumbent third-term alderman Brendan Reilly won reelection, running unopposed on the ballot.

Candidates

One write-in candidate filed:
 Richard Benedict Mayers, perennial candidate and alleged white supremacist, write-in candidate for Chicago Mayor, City Clerk, and Treasurer  in 2019; congressional candidate in 2000, 2002, 2008, 2016, and 2018; 1998 State House candidate; 1993 Berwyn city clerk and city treasurer candidate

Results

43rd ward 
Incumbent second-term alderman Michele Smith won reelection, defeating Derek Lindblom in a runoff.

Candidates 

One write-in candidate filed:
 Richard Benedict Mayers, perennial candidate and alleged white supremacist, write-in candidate for Chicago Mayor, City Clerk, and Treasurer  in 2019; congressional candidate in 2000, 2002, 2008, 2016, and 2018; 1998 State House candidate; 1993 Berwyn city clerk and city treasurer candidate

One candidate was removed from the ballot due to insufficient nominating petition signatures:

 Matthew Roney , student at DePaul University

Endorsements

First round

Runoff

Results

44th ward 
Incumbent fourth-term alderman Tom Tunney won reelection.

Candidates 

The following candidate filed nominating petitions but withdrew before ballot certification:

Patrick Shine, U.S. Air Force veteran, co-founder of non-profit This Is My Country, Inc.

One write-in candidate filed:
 Richard Benedict Mayers, perennial candidate and alleged white supremacist, write-in candidate for Chicago Mayor, City Clerk, and Treasurer  in 2019; congressional candidate in 2000, 2002, 2008, 2016, and 2018; 1998 State House candidate; 1993 Berwyn city clerk and city treasurer candidate

Endorsements

Results

46th ward 
Incumbent second-term alderman James Cappleman won reelection, defeating Marianne Lalonde in a runoff by a margin of only 25 votes (0.09% of the votes cast in the runoff).

Candidates 

Two write-in candidates filed:
 Joann Breivogel
 Richard Benedict Mayers, perennial candidate and alleged white supremacist, write-in candidate for Chicago Mayor, City Clerk, and Treasurer  in 2019; congressional candidate in 2000, 2002, 2008, 2016, and 2018; 1998 State House candidate; 1993 Berwyn city clerk and city treasurer candidate

Endorsements

Results

47th ward 
Incumbent second-term alderman Ameya Pawar did not seek reelection as alderman, opting to instead run (unsuccessfully) for City Treasurer of Chicago. Matt Martin was elected to succeed him, defeating Michael Negron in a runoff.

Candidates 

One write-in candidate filed:
 Richard Benedict Mayers, perennial candidate and alleged white supremacist, write-in candidate for Chicago Mayor, City Clerk, and Treasurer  in 2019; congressional candidate in 2000, 2002, 2008, 2016, and 2018; 1998 State House candidate; 1993 Berwyn city clerk and city treasurer candidate

Campaign 
All candidates, except Kastafaros, appeared at a forum focused on education issues on January 17, 2019. All candidates, except Ladien and Schwartzers, appeared at a forum on business issues on January 24. A third forum hosted by several neighborhood Chambers of Commerce was scheduled on January 26.

Endorsements 

Runoff

Results

48th ward 
Incumbent second-term alderman Harry Osterman won reelection, defeating David Williams III, his sole challenger.

Candidates 

One write-in candidate filed:
 Richard Benedict Mayers, perennial candidate and alleged white supremacist, write-in candidate for Chicago Mayor, City Clerk, and Treasurer  in 2019; congressional candidate in 2000, 2002, 2008, 2016, and 2018; 1998 State House candidate; 1993 Berwyn city clerk and city treasurer candidate

Endorsements

Results

49th ward 
Incumbent seventh-term alderman Joe Moore unsuccessfully sought reelection. He was defeated by Maria Hadden, his sole challenger.

Through this election, the victor Maria Hadden made history as the first LGBTQ woman of color to be elected to Chicago's City Council.

Candidates 

Two write-in candidates filed:
 Richard Benedict Mayers, perennial candidate and alleged white supremacist, write-in candidate for Chicago Mayor, City Clerk, and Treasurer  in 2019; congressional candidate in 2000, 2002, 2008, 2016, and 2018; 1998 State House candidate; 1993 Berwyn city clerk and city treasurer candidate
 Bill Morton

Two candidates were removed from the ballot due to insufficient nominating petition signatures:

Bill Morton , president of the Rogers Park Chamber of Commerce
Nathan Ben Myers

Campaign 
Hadden and Moore both identify as progressives, but their policy positions differ sharply on a number of issues, including policing, accepting donations from developers, use of tax-increment financing, and charter school expansion. Both candidates participated in a debate hosted at Sullivan High School on January 15, 2019. At the debate, they disagreed on a number of issues, including a freeze on new charter schools (Hadden supported one; Moore did not), funding for a new police training facility (Moore supported the ongoing proposal; Hadden did not), and use of tax-increment financing for the proposed Lincoln Yards project (Moore was in favor; Hadden was opposed).

In February 2019, a controversy emerged when two photographers alleged that the Moore campaign used their photographs in campaign advertisements without permission or attribution. Another controversy emerged late in the campaign when a Moore staffer accused a 15 year old Hadden volunteer (and former Moore intern) of espionage.

Endorsements

Results

50th ward 
Incumbent second-term alderman Debra Silverstein won reelection.

Candidates 

One write-in candidate filed:
 Richard Benedict Mayers, perennial candidate and alleged white supremacist, write-in candidate for Chicago Mayor, City Clerk, and Treasurer  in 2019; congressional candidate in 2000, 2002, 2008, 2016, and 2018; 1998 State House candidate; 1993 Berwyn city clerk and city treasurer candidate

The following candidate filed nominating petitions but withdrew before ballot certification:
 Majid Mustafa

Endorsements

Campaigns 
A candidate forum is scheduled for February 10, 2019.

Results

Northwest Side

26th ward 
Incumbent alderman Roberto Maldonado won reelection. Maldonado had been first appointed by Mayor Richard M. Daley in 2009, and had subsequently been reelected in 2011 and 2015.

Candidates 

Two write-in candidates filed:
 Richard Benedict Mayers, perennial candidate and alleged white supremacist, write-in candidate for Chicago Mayor, City Clerk, and Treasurer  in 2019; congressional candidate in 2000, 2002, 2008, 2016, and 2018; 1998 State House candidate; 1993 Berwyn city clerk and city treasurer candidate
 Mirko "Limo Mike Z" Zaplatic, Jr

Two candidates were removed from the ballot due to insufficient nominating petition signatures:

Angee Gonzalez 
Mirko "Limo Mike Z." Zaplatic Jr.

Endorsements

Results

30th ward 
Incumbent fourth-term alderman Ariel Reboyras won reelection, defeating Jessica Gutierrez in a runoff.

Candidates 

One write-in candidate filed:
 Richard Benedict Mayers, perennial candidate and alleged white supremacist, write-in candidate for Chicago Mayor, City Clerk, and Treasurer  in 2019; congressional candidate in 2000, 2002, 2008, 2016, and 2018; 1998 State House candidate; 1993 Berwyn city clerk and city treasurer candidate

Endorsements

Results

31st ward 
Incumbent first-term alderman Milly Santiago unsuccessfully sought reelection, losing to Felix Cardona, Jr. in a runoff.

Candidates 

One write-in candidate filed:
 Richard Benedict Mayers, perennial candidate and alleged white supremacist, write-in candidate for Chicago Mayor, City Clerk, and Treasurer  in 2019; congressional candidate in 2000, 2002, 2008, 2016, and 2018; 1998 State House candidate; 1993 Berwyn city clerk and city treasurer candidate

One candidate was removed from the ballot due to insufficient nominating petition signatures:

 Renne Chavez, candidate for 31st ward alderman in 2015

Endorsements 

Runoff

Results

33rd ward 
Incumbent alderman Deb Mell unsuccessfully sought reelection. Mell had first been appointed by Mayor Rahm Emanuel in 2013, and had subsequently been reelected in 2015. She was defeated by Rossana Rodriguez Sanchez in a runoff.

Candidates 

One write-in candidate filed:
 Richard Benedict Mayers, perennial candidate and alleged white supremacist, write-in candidate for Chicago Mayor, City Clerk, and Treasurer  in 2019; congressional candidate in 2000, 2002, 2008, 2016, and 2018; 1998 State House candidate; 1993 Berwyn city clerk and city treasurer candidate

The following candidates submitted nominating petition signatures but withdrew before the certification process:
 Joel Zawko

Endorsements 
First round

Runoff

Campaign 
All three candidates appeared at a candidate forum hosted at Bateman Elementary School on February 7, 2019. The forum was originally scheduled for January 30 but was postponed due to the polar vortex.

Results

35th ward 
Incumbent first-term alderman Carlos Ramirez-Rosa was reelected, defeating Amanda Yu Dieterich, his sole challenger.

Candidates 

One write-in candidate filed:
 Richard Benedict Mayers, perennial candidate and alleged white supremacist, write-in candidate for Chicago Mayor, City Clerk, and Treasurer  in 2019; congressional candidate in 2000, 2002, 2008, 2016, and 2018; 1998 State House candidate; 1993 Berwyn city clerk and city treasurer candidate

Two candidates were removed from the ballot due to insufficient nominating petition signatures:

 Mayra Gonzalez
Walter Zarnecki, Republican Party nominee for Cook County Board Commissioner for the 8th district

Endorsements

Campaign 
Dieterich and Ramirez-Rosa appeared at a candidate forum hosted by Logan Square Preservation on January 8, 2019.

Results

36th ward 
Incumbent first-term alderman Gilbert Villegas was reelected, running unopposed on the ballot.

Candidates

One write-in candidate filed:
 Richard Benedict Mayers, perennial candidate and alleged white supremacist, write-in candidate for Chicago Mayor, City Clerk, and Treasurer  in 2019; congressional candidate in 2000, 2002, 2008, 2016, and 2018; 1998 State House candidate; 1993 Berwyn city clerk and city treasurer candidate

Results

38th ward 
Incumbent first-term alderman Nicholas Sposato was reelected, running unopposed on the ballot.

Candidates 

One write-in candidate filed:
 Richard Benedict Mayers, perennial candidate and alleged white supremacist, write-in candidate for Chicago Mayor, City Clerk, and Treasurer  in 2019; congressional candidate in 2000, 2002, 2008, 2016, and 2018; 1998 State House candidate; 1993 Berwyn city clerk and city treasurer candidate

One candidate was removed from the ballot due to insufficient nominating petition signatures:
 Ralph Pawlikowski, higher education professional and community volunteer

Endorsements

Results

39th ward 
Incumbent alderman Margaret Laurino did not run for reelection. Laurino had first been appointed by Mayor Richard M. Daley in 1994, and had been reelected six times. Samantha Nugent was elected to succeed her, defeating Robert Murphy in a runoff.

Candidates 

Two write-in candidates filed:
 Mary K. Hunter
 Richard Benedict Mayers, perennial candidate and alleged white supremacist, write-in candidate for Chicago Mayor, City Clerk, and Treasurer  in 2019; congressional candidate in 2000, 2002, 2008, 2016, and 2018; 1998 State House candidate; 1993 Berwyn city clerk and city treasurer candidate

The following candidates submitted nominating petition signatures but withdrew before the certification process:

 Jeffrey S. La Porte

Endorsements 
First round

Runoff

Results

41st ward 
Incumbent first-term alderman Anthony Napolitano won reelection, defeating Tim Heneghan, his sole challenger.

Candidates 

One write-in candidate filed:
 Richard Benedict Mayers, perennial candidate and alleged white supremacist, write-in candidate for Chicago Mayor, City Clerk, and Treasurer  in 2019; congressional candidate in 2000, 2002, 2008, 2016, and 2018; 1998 State House candidate; 1993 Berwyn city clerk and city treasurer candidate

Endorsements

Results

45th ward 
Incumbent second-term alderman John Arena unsuccessfully sought reelection. He was defeated by Jim Gardiner.

Candidates 

Two write-in candidates filed:
 Richard Benedict Mayers, perennial candidate and alleged white supremacist, write-in candidate for Chicago Mayor, City Clerk, and Treasurer  in 2019; congressional candidate in 2000, 2002, 2008, 2016, and 2018; 1998 State House candidate; 1993 Berwyn city clerk and city treasurer candidate
 Jose Munoz

Endorsements

Results

West Side

22nd ward 
Incumbent alderman Ricardo Muñoz did not run for reelection. Muñoz had first been appointed by Mayor Richard M. Daley in 1993, and had been subsequently reelected six times. Michael D. Rodriguez was elected to succeed him.

Candidates 

One write-in candidate filed:
 Richard Benedict Mayers, perennial candidate and alleged white supremacist, write-in candidate for Chicago Mayor, City Clerk, and Treasurer  in 2019; congressional candidate in 2000, 2002, 2008, 2016, and 2018; 1998 State House candidate; 1993 Berwyn city clerk and city treasurer candidate

Endorsements

Campaign 
All four candidates appeared at a candidate forum at Little Village Lawndale High School on January 31, 2019.

Results

24th ward 
Incumbent first-term alderman Michael Scott Jr. won reelection.

Candidates 

Two write-in candidates filed:
Patricia "Pat" Marshall Adams
 Richard Benedict Mayers, perennial candidate and alleged white supremacist, write-in candidate for Chicago Mayor, City Clerk, and Treasurer  in 2019; congressional candidate in 2000, 2002, 2008, 2016, and 2018; 1998 State House candidate; 1993 Berwyn city clerk and city treasurer candidate

Two candidates were removed from the ballot due to insufficient nominating petition signatures:

 Edward Ward
Patricia Marshall , non-profit founder and manager, community activist and organizer

One candidate filed nominating petitions but withdrew before ballot certification:

 Larry Nelson, Republican Committeeman for the 24th Ward

Endorsements

Results

25th ward 
Incumbent alderman Danny Solis did not run for reelection. Solis had first been appointed by Mayor Richard M. Daley in 1996, and had subsequently been reelected five times. Byron Sigcho-Lopez won the race to succeed him, defeating Alex Acevedo in a runoff.

Candidates 

One write-in candidate filed:
 Richard Benedict Mayers, perennial candidate and alleged white supremacist, write-in candidate for Chicago Mayor, City Clerk, and Treasurer  in 2019; congressional candidate in 2000, 2002, 2008, 2016, and 2018; 1998 State House candidate; 1993 Berwyn city clerk and city treasurer candidate

Campaign 
All five candidates appeared at a forum hosted by the Pilsen Law Center and the Hispanic Lawyers Association of Illinois on January 12, 2019. Two additional forums were scheduled: one hosted by the West Loop Democratic Club is scheduled on January 23, and one hosted by the Coalition for a Better Chinese American Community and other Chinatown community organizations on January 28.

Endorsements 
First round

Runoff

Results

27th ward 
Incumbent sixth-term alderman Walter Burnett Jr. won reelection, defeating Cynthia Bednarz, his sole challenger.

Candidates 

Three write-in candidates filed:
 Ellen Anderson Corley
 Andrea "Siri" Hibbler
 Richard Benedict Mayers, perennial candidate and alleged white supremacist, write-in candidate for Chicago Mayor, City Clerk, and Treasurer  in 2019; congressional candidate in 2000, 2002, 2008, 2016, and 2018; 1998 State House candidate; 1993 Berwyn city clerk and city treasurer candidate

Endorsements

Results

28th ward 
Incumbent second-term alderman Jason Ervin won reelection.

Candidates 

Three write-in candidates filed:
 Timothy Gladney
 Justina Winfrey
 Richard Benedict Mayers, perennial candidate and alleged white supremacist, write-in candidate for Chicago Mayor, City Clerk, and Treasurer  in 2019; congressional candidate in 2000, 2002, 2008, 2016, and 2018; 1998 State House candidate; 1993 Berwyn city clerk and city treasurer candidate

The following candidate submitted nominating petition signatures but withdrew before ballot certification:

Justina L. Winfrey, education non-profit founder and manager
Theresa Rayford

Endorsements

Results

29th ward 
Incumbent first-term alderman Chris Taliaferro won reelection.

Candidates 

One write-in candidate filed:
 Richard Benedict Mayers, perennial candidate and alleged white supremacist, write-in candidate for Chicago Mayor, City Clerk, and Treasurer  in 2019; congressional candidate in 2000, 2002, 2008, 2016, and 2018; 1998 State House candidate; 1993 Berwyn city clerk and city treasurer candidate

One candidate was removed from the ballot due to insufficient nominating petition signatures:

 Gayinga Washington

Endorsements

Results

37th ward 
Incumbent alderman Emma Mitts won reelection. Mitts had first been appointed by Mayor Richard M. Daley in 2000, and had subsequently been reelected in 2003, 2007, 2011, and 2015.

Candidates 

Three write-in candidates filed:
 Stephen Hodge
 Richard Benedict Mayers, perennial candidate and alleged white supremacist, write-in candidate for Chicago Mayor, City Clerk, and Treasurer  in 2019; congressional candidate in 2000, 2002, 2008, 2016, and 2018; 1998 State House candidate; 1993 Berwyn city clerk and city treasurer candidate
 Otis Percy

Endorsements

Results

Southwest Side

11th ward 
Incumbent first-term alderman Patrick Daley Thompson won reelection, defeating David Mihalyfy, his sole challenger on the ballot.

Candidates 

One write-in candidate filed:
 Richard Benedict Mayers, perennial candidate and alleged white supremacist, write-in candidate for Chicago Mayor, City Clerk, and Treasurer  in 2019; congressional candidate in 2000, 2002, 2008, 2016, and 2018; 1998 State House candidate; 1993 Berwyn city clerk and city treasurer candidate

Endorsements

Results

12th ward 
Incumbent fourth-term alderman George Cardenas won reelection.

Candidates 

Two write-in candidates filed:
 Samuel Alcantar
 Richard Benedict Mayers, perennial candidate and alleged white supremacist, write-in candidate for Chicago Mayor, City Clerk, and Treasurer  in 2019; congressional candidate in 2000, 2002, 2008, 2016, and 2018; 1998 State House candidate; 1993 Berwyn city clerk and city treasurer candidate

Two candidates were removed from the ballot due to insufficient nominating petition signatures:

Francisco Nunez Sr.
Samuel Alcantar

Endorsements

Results

13th ward 
Incumbent second-term alderman Marty Quinn won reelection, defeating David Krupa, his sole challenger.

Candidates 

One write-in candidate filed:
 Richard Benedict Mayers, perennial candidate and alleged white supremacist, write-in candidate for Chicago Mayor, City Clerk, and Treasurer  in 2019; congressional candidate in 2000, 2002, 2008, 2016, and 2018; 1998 State House candidate; 1993 Berwyn city clerk and city treasurer candidate

Endorsements

Campaign
Krupa ran on a platform of lowering property taxes and increasing police presence in the ward. Krupa walked back comments from 2016, in which he had declared himself to be a, "day one Trump supporter" to a reporter from the Chicago Reader. Krupa received support from 2018 Republican candidate for Illinois governor, Jeanne Ives, who helped fundraise for his campaign.

Quinn had originally challenged Krupa's ballot petition. However, Quinn's campaign submitted 2,800 sworn affidavits to the Board of Elections, supposedly from residents that had claimed they never signed Krupa's petitions. This create a problem for Quinn, since Krupa had only filed around 1,700 signatures in his petition, and only 200 of those signatures overlapped with affidavits submitted by Quinn's campaign. This meant that the majority of affidavits submitted by Quinn were either falsified or fraudulent. Quinn later dropped his challenge to Krupa, meaning that Krupa would appear on the ballot. Reports arose that the FBI had opened an investigation into Quinn's affidavits. This incident also brought free publicity to Krupa's candidacy.

Results

14th ward 
Incumbent alderman Edward M. Burke won reelection. The longest-serving member of the Chicago City Council, Burke had consecutively served twelve full terms, plus a partial term. Burke won reelection despite having had a criminal complaint filed against him by the FBI on January 2, 2019, for attempted extortion.

Candidates 

One write-in candidate filed:
 Richard Benedict Mayers, perennial candidate and alleged white supremacist, write-in candidate for Chicago Mayor, City Clerk, and Treasurer  in 2019; congressional candidate in 2000, 2002, 2008, 2016, and 2018; 1998 State House candidate; 1993 Berwyn city clerk and city treasurer candidate

The following candidate had submitted nominating petitions but withdrew:
 Irene Corral
Jose Torrez , community development non-profit manager, activist, legal aid professional

Endorsements

Results

15th ward 
Incumbent first-term alderman Raymond Lopez won reelection, defeating Rafa Yanez in a runoff.

Candidates 

One write-in candidate filed:
 Richard Benedict Mayers, perennial candidate and alleged white supremacist, write-in candidate for Chicago Mayor, City Clerk, and Treasurer  in 2019; congressional candidate in 2000, 2002, 2008, 2016, and 2018; 1998 State House candidate; 1993 Berwyn city clerk and city treasurer candidate

One candidate was removed from the ballot due to insufficient nominating petition signatures:

 Joel Riojas, business entrepreneur

One candidate submitted nominating petition signatures but withdrew before the certification process:

 Deborah Lane

Endorsements

Campaign 
A candidate forum was scheduled on February 5, 2019.

Results

16th ward 
Incumbent third-term alderman Toni Foulkes unsuccessfully sought reelection. She was defeated in a runoff election by Stephanie Coleman, whom she had narrowly defeated four years earlier.

Candidates 

One write-in candidate filed:
 Richard Benedict Mayers, perennial candidate and alleged white supremacist, write-in candidate for Chicago Mayor, City Clerk, and Treasurer  in 2019; congressional candidate in 2000, 2002, 2008, 2016, and 2018; 1998 State House candidate; 1993 Berwyn city clerk and city treasurer candidate

Endorsements 
First round

Runoff

Results

17th ward 
First-term incumbent alderman David H. Moore won reelection, defeating Raynetta Greenleaf, his sole challenger.

Candidates 

One write-in candidate filed:
 Richard Benedict Mayers, perennial candidate and alleged white supremacist, write-in candidate for Chicago Mayor, City Clerk, and Treasurer  in 2019; congressional candidate in 2000, 2002, 2008, 2016, and 2018; 1998 State House candidate; 1993 Berwyn city clerk and city treasurer candidate

Endorsements

Results

18th ward 
Incumbent first-term alderman Derrick Curtis won reelection, defeating Chuks Onyezia, his sole challenger.

Candidates 

Two write-in candidate filed:
 Richard Benedict Mayers, perennial candidate and alleged white supremacist, write-in candidate for Chicago Mayor, City Clerk, and Treasurer  in 2019; congressional candidate in 2000, 2002, 2008, 2016, and 2018; 1998 State House candidate; 1993 Berwyn city clerk and city treasurer candidate
 Robert Topps, Jr.

Endorsements

Results

23rd ward 
Incumbent alderman Silvana Tabares, who had been appointed by Mayor Rahm Emanuel in 2018, won reelection to a first full term, defeating Paulino Villarreal, her sole challenger.

Candidates 

One write-in candidate filed:
 Richard Benedict Mayers, perennial candidate and alleged white supremacist, write-in candidate for Chicago Mayor, City Clerk, and Treasurer  in 2019; congressional candidate in 2000, 2002, 2008, 2016, and 2018; 1998 State House candidate; 1993 Berwyn city clerk and city treasurer candidate

One candidate was removed from the ballot due to insufficient nominating petition signatures:

 Charles Hughes

Endorsements

Results

South Side

3rd ward 
Incumbent third-term alderman Pat Dowell won reelection, defeating Alexandria Willis, her sole challenger on the ballot.

Candidates 

Two write-in candidates filed:
 Richard Benedict Mayers, perennial candidate and alleged white supremacist, write-in candidate for Chicago Mayor, City Clerk, and Treasurer  in 2019; congressional candidate in 2000, 2002, 2008, 2016, and 2018; 1998 State House candidate; 1993 Berwyn city clerk and city treasurer candidate
Darva Watkins

Two candidates were removed from the ballot due to insufficient nominating petition signatures:

 Lelan M. Jones
 Andre Love

Endorsements

Campaigns 
A candidate forum was scheduled on January 29, 2019.

Results

4th ward 
Incumbent alderman Sophia King, who had been appointed by Mayor Rahm Emanuel in 2016, won election to a first full term, defeating Ebony Lucas, her sole challenger on the ballot.

Candidates 

One write-in candidate filed:
 Richard Benedict Mayers, perennial candidate and alleged white supremacist, write-in candidate for Chicago Mayor, City Clerk, and Treasurer  in 2019; congressional candidate in 2000, 2002, 2008, 2016, and 2018; 1998 State House candidate; 1993 Berwyn city clerk and city treasurer candidate

Endorsements

Results

5th ward 
Incumbent fifth-term alderman Leslie Hairston won reelection, defeating William Calloway in a runoff.

Candidates 

Two write-in candidates filed:
 Loretta Lomax
 Richard Benedict Mayers, perennial candidate and alleged white supremacist, write-in candidate for Chicago Mayor, City Clerk, and Treasurer  in 2019; congressional candidate in 2000, 2002, 2008, 2016, and 2018; 1998 State House candidate; 1993 Berwyn city clerk and city treasurer candidate

One candidate was removed from the ballot due to insufficient nominating petition signatures:

Shelly Quiles, social worker, psychotherapist, educator

Endorsements 
First round

Runoff

Results

6th ward 
Incumbent second-term alderman Roderick Sawyer won reelection, defeating Deborah A. Foster-Bonner in a runoff.

Candidates 

Two write-in candidates filed:
 LaTanya Gooden
 Richard Benedict Mayers, perennial candidate and alleged white supremacist, write-in candidate for Chicago Mayor, City Clerk, and Treasurer  in 2019; congressional candidate in 2000, 2002, 2008, 2016, and 2018; 1998 State House candidate; 1993 Berwyn city clerk and city treasurer candidate

Endorsements

Results

7th ward 
Incumbent first-term alderman Gregory Mitchell won reelection.

Candidates 

Two write-in candidates filed:
 Kim Curtis
 Richard Benedict Mayers, perennial candidate and alleged white supremacist, write-in candidate for Chicago Mayor, City Clerk, and Treasurer  in 2019; congressional candidate in 2000, 2002, 2008, 2016, and 2018; 1998 State House candidate; 1993 Berwyn city clerk and city treasurer candidate

Two candidates were removed from the ballot due to insufficient nominating petition signatures:

 Kim Curtis
Sharon Lewis , community organizer, consultant

Endorsements

Results

8th ward 
Incumbent alderman Michelle A. Harris won reelection. Harris had first been appointed alderman in 2006 by Mayor Richard M. Daley, and had subsequently been reelected in 2007, 2011, and 2015.

Candidates 

One write-in candidate filed:
 Richard Benedict Mayers, perennial candidate and alleged white supremacist, write-in candidate for Chicago Mayor, City Clerk, and Treasurer  in 2019; congressional candidate in 2000, 2002, 2008, 2016, and 2018; 1998 State House candidate; 1993 Berwyn city clerk and city treasurer candidate

Two candidates were removed from the ballot due to insufficient nominating petition signatures:

 Dionte Lawrence
Sherri Bolling , community volunteer, researcher

Endorsements

Results

9th ward 
Incumbent fifth-term alderman Anthony Beale won reelection.

Candidates 

Three write-in candidates filed:
 Marcia Brown-Williams, Chicago Public Schools teacher, assistant director of Quest Center and Chicago Teachers Union
 Richard Benedict Mayers, perennial candidate and alleged white supremacist, write-in candidate for Chicago Mayor, City Clerk, and Treasurer  in 2019; congressional candidate in 2000, 2002, 2008, 2016, and 2018; 1998 State House candidate; 1993 Berwyn city clerk and city treasurer candidate
 Rachel Williams

One candidate was removed from the ballot due to insufficient nominating petition signatures:

 Marcia Brown-Williams , Chicago Public Schools teacher, assistant director of Quest Center and Chicago Teachers Union

One candidate submitted nominating petitions but withdrew before ballot certification:

 Rachel Williams

Endorsements

Campaign 
A candidate forum was scheduled on January 26, 2019, at the Altgeld Murray Community Center.

Results

10th ward 
First-term incumbent Susie Sadlowski Garza won reelection, defeating Robert "Bobby" Loncar, her sole challenger.

Candidates 

One candidate was removed from the ballot due to insufficient nominating petition signatures:

 Yessenia Carreón, community activist

Endorsements

Results

19th ward 
Second-term incumbent Matthew O'Shea won reelection, defeating David Dewar, his sole challenger on the ballot.

Candidates 

One write-in candidate filed:
 Richard Benedict Mayers, perennial candidate and alleged white supremacist, write-in candidate for Chicago Mayor, City Clerk, and Treasurer  in 2019; congressional candidate in 2000, 2002, 2008, 2016, and 2018; 1998 State House candidate; 1993 Berwyn city clerk and city treasurer candidate

Endorsements

Results

20th ward 
Incumbent third-term alderman Willie Cochran did not run for reelection. Jeanette Taylor was elected to succeed him, defeating Nicole J. Johnson in a runoff.

Candidates 

Two write-in candidates filed:
 Richard Benedict Mayers, perennial candidate and alleged white supremacist, write-in candidate for Chicago Mayor, City Clerk, and Treasurer  in 2019; congressional candidate in 2000, 2002, 2008, 2016, and 2018; 1998 State House candidate; 1993 Berwyn city clerk and city treasurer candidate
Mareo Phillips

Six candidates were removed from the ballot due to insufficient nominating petition signatures:

 Cassius Rudolph
 Charles Hilliard
 Clifton Pierce
 Kimetha Hill
 Matthew Johnson
 Sheila Scott

Endorsements 
First round

Runoff

Results

21st ward 
Incumbent fourth-term alderman Howard Brookins won reelection, defeating Marvin McNeil in a runoff.

Candidates 

Two write-in candidates filed:
 Richard Benedict Mayers, perennial candidate and alleged white supremacist, write-in candidate for Chicago Mayor, City Clerk, and Treasurer  in 2019; congressional candidate in 2000, 2002, 2008, 2016, and 2018; 1998 State House candidate; 1993 Berwyn city clerk and city treasurer candidate
 Bonnie Poole "Granny"

One candidate was removed from the ballot due to insufficient nominating petition signatures:

 Julius Modeliste

Endorsements

Results

34th ward 
Incumbent alderman Carrie Austin won reelection, defeating Preston Brown Jr., her sole challenger on the ballot. She had first been appointed alderman by Mayor Richard M. Daley in 1994, and had subsequently been reelected to six consecutive subsequent terms before this.

Candidates 

Four write-in candidates filed:
 Donna M. Johnson
 Richard Benedict Mayers, perennial candidate and alleged white supremacist, write-in candidate for Chicago Mayor, City Clerk, and Treasurer  in 2019; congressional candidate in 2000, 2002, 2008, 2016, and 2018; 1998 State House candidate; 1993 Berwyn city clerk and city treasurer candidate
 Tamara McCullough AKA Tamar Manasseh, write-in candidate for mayor in 2019
 Paris Walker Thomas

Endorsements

Results

See also 
 Chicago aldermanic elections, 2015
 Chicago mayoral election, 2019
 United States elections, 2019
 List of Chicago aldermen since 1923

Notes

References

External links 
 List of candidate debates and forums

Chicago adlermanic
Chicago City Council elections